The Beretta 501 Sniper is an Italian-made bolt-action sniper rifle. Introduced in 1985, it was intended for military and police use.  The Beretta Sniper was adopted by number of European police forces and by armies in other parts of the world.

Because of competition by more modern sniper rifle designs and due to the lack of interest in the M501 rifle, the product was discontinued. The 501 Sniper has been replaced in service by newer sniper rifle designs.

Design
The 501 is a conventional bolt-action rifle that utilizes a modified Mauser action. The 501 has a heavy, free-floating barrel fitted with a flash suppressor.

The 501 fires 7.62mm NATO rounds, weighs 5.56 kg, is 1165mm in length, has a 586 mm barrel and uses a 5-round detachable box magazine.

The standard stock is made of wood. Within a stock is built a tube that's attached to a receiver. It contains a harmonic balancer, a weight and springs help manage recoil. At the end of the tube can be used to mount a bipod.

The sight mount is a NATO STANAG 2324 and takes any NATO-standard night-vision and optical sight.

Users
 : Italian Army, has been replaced with the Accuracy International Arctic Warfare Magnum rifles.

See also
 Accuracy International PM
 Unique Alpine TPG-1

References 

 Stanisław Kochański, Brygady antyterrorystyczne Operacje Uzbrojenie, SIGMA NOT 1992. 
 Andrzej Ciepliński, Ryszard Woźniak, Broń wyborowa 2, Wojskowy Przegląd Techniczny i Logistyczny 2/96. ISSN 1230-7386

7.62×51mm NATO rifles
Bolt-action rifles of Italy
Sniper
Military equipment introduced in the 1980s
pl:Karabin Beretta M501